Cliff Ellen (born 22 March 1936, in Melbourne) is an Australian character actor who played a prominent guest role on the soap opera Neighbours as Charlie Cassidy.

His first role was in Homicide. His credits include Crackerjack, Garbo, and Phar Lap. A theatre actor of many years, Ellen played the role of Gaston in the Australian touring production of Steve Martin's Picasso at the Lapin Agile as well as Hannie Rayson's Inheritance. He also appeared in the 2006 Australian film BoyTown. Ellen writes a column for a local newspaper based on the Mornington Peninsula.

Cliff Ellen is the nephew of Joff Ellen, Australian television actor and comedian

Filmography

References

External links

Interview at Perfect Blend

1936 births
Living people
Male actors from Melbourne
Australian male stage actors
Australian male soap opera actors